The 2016 NCAA Division I women's gymnastics season took place between January 2 and April 17, 2016.

Rule changes 
The only rule change for the 2016 NCAA Women's Gymnastics season, which was enforced for both Division II and III, was the devaluation of the start value for the popular full-twisting yurchenko vault from a Perfect 10 to 9.950.

National standings

References 

NCAA Women's Gymnastics championship
NCAA Division I women's gymnastics season
NCAA Division I women's gymnastics season